Edith Olumide Alumeida Agoye (born 19 January 1976) is a Nigerian retired footballer who last played for Shooting Stars S.C.

Career
Agoye along with his former teammate Wasiu Taiwo moved in the summer of 2008 to Shooting Stars SC. He became an assistant coach for 3 SC in 2013.
He resigned as Head coach in 2019 after 3SC failed to get promoted.

References

External links

1976 births
Living people
Nigerian footballers
Nigeria international footballers
Association football midfielders

Shooting Stars S.C. players
FC Schaffhausen players
Rot-Weiß Oberhausen players
Espérance Sportive de Tunis players
FC Braunau players
Bnei Sakhnin F.C. players
Maccabi Herzliya F.C. players
Hapoel Be'er Sheva F.C. players
Bridge F.C. players
Enyimba F.C. players
Swiss Super League players
2. Bundesliga players
Israeli Premier League players
Liga Leumit players
Nigerian expatriate footballers
Expatriate footballers in Switzerland
Nigerian expatriate sportspeople in Switzerland
Expatriate footballers in Germany
Nigerian expatriate sportspeople in Germany
Expatriate footballers in Tunisia
Nigerian expatriate sportspeople in Tunisia
Expatriate footballers in Austria
Nigerian expatriate sportspeople in Austria
Expatriate footballers in Israel
Nigerian expatriate sportspeople in Israel